Simon Gleeson (born 13 January 1977) is an Australian actor and singer who is best known for playing Jean Valjean in the 2014 Australian revival and in the 2016/17 cast of the West End production of Les Misérables.

He performed in Noël Coward's Hayfever for the Melbourne Theatre Company, and returned to the Melbourne Theatre Company in 2018 to play Sir Robert Chiltern in Oscar Wilde's An Ideal Husband.

In the United Kingdom he has performed in plays at The Royal National Theatre and in the West End of London. He has appeared in the popular BBC soap opera EastEnders, playing SJ Fletcher's boyfriend Sid Clarke. In 2007 Gleeson appeared in 'Kombat Opera Presents' for BBC television. He appeared with Richard Dreyfuss and Nia Vardalos in 2009's My Life in Ruins.

Early life 

Gleeson grew up in The Rock, a small country town in New South Wales with his parents and sister, Sara Gleeson (who is an actress). He completed his secondary education at Xavier College where he was named School Vice Captain and House President. Gleeson trained at the Western Australian Academy of Performing Arts.

Career 

Gleeson has performed in many musicals and plays in Australia and in London's West End including Mamma Mia!, Eureka, The Far Pavilions and Imagine This. He has performed in plays for Sydney Theatre Company and Royal National Theatre in the UK. In 2013/2014 he was in the original company of Rupert for Melbourne Theatre Company and toured the play to the John F. Kennedy Center for the Performing Arts. He portrayed Raoul in the Australian production of Andrew Lloyd Webber's musical Love Never Dies, the sequel to Lloyd Webber's highly successful The Phantom of the Opera.

Gleeson has appeared in numerous television series in Australia and the UK, most notably as SJ in EastEnders and as a principal cast member of 'Kombat Opera Presents' for BBC television.

From 2014 Gleeson played Jean Valjean in the Australian tour of Cameron Macintosh's Les Miserables. He would remain with the cast throughout 2015 and has been cast in the role for its Manila run. He was nominated for (and won) a Helpmann Award for the role. From 5 December 2016, he has played Jean Valjean in the West End production of Les Misérables.

In 2018, Gleeson joined "The Production Company" for their production of Oklahoma! as Curly McLain alongside Anna O’Byrne.
 
Gleeson released his debut album, titled Elements in 2015.
The track list consists of:
 "A Bit of Earth"
 "Anthem"
 "She’s Got A Way" / "Something"
 "End of The World"
 "Being Alive"
 "Bring Him Home"
 "And the Rain Keeps Falling Down"
 "Stay With Me"
 "Sorry Seems To Be the Hardest Word" – featuring Natalie O’Donnell
 "If I Loved You"
 "The Day You Went Away"

Nominations and awards 

In 2014, Gleeson was awarded a Helpmann Award for his role as Jean Valjean in the Australian tour of Les Miserables. He has been nominated for a Helpmann Award twice before for Sky in Mamma Mia!, and Raoul in Love Never Dies and has been nominated several times for a Green Room Award. In London he was nominated for a Whatsonstage.com Award for The Far Pavilions. Gleeson has also been nominated for a Glug Award.

References

External links

Simon Gleeson on Twitter
Simon Gleeson on Facebook
Simon Gleeson: The Dark Side of Raoul

1977 births
Australian male television actors
Australian male musical theatre actors
Living people
Helpmann Award winners
Western Australian Academy of Performing Arts alumni